Sid is a nickname deriving from (and hypocorism for) the given name Sidney, Siddhartha, Sidonia, Siddiq  or Sidra, though it is also used by people with other given names.

Notable people
Sid Bream (born 1960), American baseball player
Sid Caesar (1922–2014), American actor and comedian
Sid Collins (1922–1977), American radio announcer for the Indianapolis 500
Sid Eudy, professional wrestler known as "Sycho" Sid Vicious/Justice
Sid Field (1904–1950), English comedy entertainer
Sid Gepford (1895–1924), American football player
Sid Gilman, American neurologist
Sid Gillman (1911–2003), American football player and coach
Sid Gordon (1917–1975), American baseball player
Sid Grauman (1879–1950), American theatre impresario 
Sid Hadden (1877–1934), English cricketer
Sid Haig (1939–2019), American actor
Sid Hartman (1920–2020), American sports journalist
Sid James (1913–1976), South African-born English film and television actor
Sid Luckman (1916–1998), American football player
Sid Meier (born 1954), game developer, famous for his Civilization series
Sid Tannenbaum (1925–1986), American basketball player
Sid Terris ("Ghost of the Ghetto", 1926–1974), American lightweight boxer
Sid Vicious (1957–1979), English punk rock musician, once a member of the Sex Pistols
Sid Wilson (born 1977), turntablist for the musical group Slipknot

Fictional characters

Acronym 
SID, Space Intruder Detector, a computerized tracking satellite from UFO

Singular 
Sid or Cid, recurring character in the Final Fantasy series
Sid, a character in the 2009 American comedy film The Hangover
Sid, archetypal small investor used to promote the privatisation of British Gas plc
Sid, a goofy ground sloth in the Ice Age film franchise
Sid, Cookie Monster's real name
Sid, a supporting character in Nickelodeon's Hey Arnold!
Sid (The Dumping Ground)

With surname 
 Sid Arkale, character from the anime Bakugan: Gundalian Invaders
 Sid Chang, a supporting female character in The Loud House spin-off The Casagrandes
 Sid Dabster, character in the web comic User Friendly
 Sid Jenkins, character in the British series Skins, played by Mike Bailey
 Sid Phillips, the antagonist in the 1995 3D computer-animated film Toy Story and one of the few human characters in the franchise
 Sid Snot, ageing biker, one of the characters portrayed by Kenny Everett
 Sid Rothman, a hitman, portrayed by Robert Knepper in the TNT show Mob City.

With title 
Lock Dealer Sid, a New Generation Rider of Kamen Rider Gaim known as Kamen Rider Sigurd
Sid the Cussing Rabbit, a puppet on the Late Late Show with Craig Ferguson
Sid the Dummy, demon-hunter trapped in the body of a puppet in Buffy the Vampire Slayer
Sid the Science Kid, main character of the children's show named after him.
Sid the Sexist, character in the comic book Viz
Sid the Squid, character in the Animaniacs episode Hurray for Slappy
Sid 6.7, AI computer virus that escapes into reality and is chased down by Wesley Snipes in the 1995 film Virtuosity

See also
El Cid (c. 1040 – 1099), Castilian nobleman
Syd Barrett (1946–2006), English progressive rock musician, founding member of Pink Floyd
Syd (disambiguation)

Nicknames
English masculine given names
English feminine given names
English unisex given names